Ayan Allahverdiyeva (born 21 February 2005) is an Azerbaijani chess player, European Youth Chess Championship winner (2018).

Biography
In 2013 she won the Azerbaijan Youth Chess Championship for girls U8.In 2014 and 2015 Ayan Allahverdiyeva won the Azerbaijani Youth Chess Championship for girls in the U10 age group, but in 2016 and 2017 she repeated this success in the girls U12 age group. In 2018, Ayan Allahverdiyeva won the sixth consecutive title in the Azerbaijani Youth Chess Championship - this time in the U14 age group of girls. In the same year, she also participated in the Azerbaijani Junior Chess Championships for girls in the U20 age group and won a bronze medal. In 2017, she made her debut in the Azerbaijani Women's Chess Championship final, which took 15th place.

Ayan Allahverdiyeva repeatedly represented Azerbaijan at the European Youth Chess Championships and World Youth Chess Championships in different age groups. In 2015, she won silver medal in the European Youth Chess Championship in the U10 girls age group. In 2017, she won bronze medal in the European Youth Chess Championship in the U12 girls age group. In 2018, in Riga Ayan Allahverdiyeva won European Youth Chess Championship in the U14 girls age group. In 2019, in Bratislava she repeatedly won European Youth Chess Championship in the U14 girls age group.

Ayan Allahverdiyeva played for Azerbaijan-3 team in the Women's Chess Olympiad:
 In 2016, at fourth board in the 42nd Chess Olympiad (women) in Baku (+4, =1, -1).

References

External links

Ayan Allahverdiyeva chess games at 365Chess.com

2005 births
Living people
Azerbaijani female chess players
Chess Olympiad competitors